The clans of Brahmins belonging to Mithila region of the Indian Subcontinent are known as Maithil Brahmins.

List of Maithil Brahmins

A–B 

 Acharya Rameshwar Jha, Sanskrit scholar
 Aditya Jha, Indo-Canadian entrepreneur and philanthropist
 Aditya Nath Jha (1911–1972), Indian Civil Service, recipient of the Padma Vibhushan
 Ajay Jha (1956–2013), Indian cricketer
 Amardeep Jha (born 1960), Indian film and television actress

 Anshuman Jha (born 1986), Indian actor
 Anuranjan Jha (born 1977), Indian journalist
 Anurita Jha (born 1986), Indian actress
 Apoorvanand Jha, Indian professor of Hindi

C–N 

 Chandeshwor Jha, Nepalese politician
 D. N. Jha (born c. 1940), Indian historian and professor
 Durgananda Jha (1941–1963), Nepalese failed assassin
 Ganganath Jha (1842–1971), Sanskrit and philosophy scholar from Bihar
 Gonu Jha (13th century), Indian wit character
 Gopal Jee Thakur (born 1969), BJP Member Of Parliament, Darbhanga Lok Sabha
 Hetukar Jha (born 1944), Indian author and professor of sociology
 Kamal Nath Jha (1923–2003), Indian freedom fighter, social activist, and politician
 Kanchinath Jha "Kiran" (1906–1989), Indian Maithili-language writer
 Lakshmi Kant Jha (1913–1988), Governor of the Reserve Bank of India
 Manish Jha (born 1978), Indian film director and screenwriter
 Nagendra Nath Jha (born 1935), Indian diplomat and lieutenant governor
 Narendra Jha (1964–2018), Indian television actor
 Nidhi Jha, Indian television actress

P–R 

 Pankaj Jha, Indian actor
 Parmanand Jha (born 1946), Nepalese politician, Vice President of Nepal
 Piyush Jha, Indian director and screenwriter
 Prabhat Jha (epidemiologist) (born 1965), Indian-Canadian epidemiologist and health economist
 Prabhat Jha (politician) (born 1957), Indian MP and National Vice President of Bharatiya Janata Party
 Prakash Jha (born 1952), Indian film producer, director and screenwriter
 Prayag Jha (born 1945), Indian artist specializing in etching
 Prem Shankar Jha (born 1938), Indian journalist, author and columnist
 Radhanandan Jha (1929–2005), Indian politician from the Congress Party
 Radhika Jha (born 1970), Indian novelist
 Raghunath Jha (born 1939), Indian politician
 Raj Kamal Jha (born 1966), Indian novelist and journalist
 Rajeev Jha (born 1976), Nepalese politician and General Secretary of Nepal Sadbhavana Party
 Ramashreya Jha (1928–2009), Indian composer and teacher of Hindustani classical music
 Ramesh Chandra Jha (1928–1994), Indian poet, novelist and freedom fighter

S–V 

 Sanjay Jha (born 1963), Indian businessman and CEO
 Sanjeev Jha (born 1979), Indian politician
 Saurav Jha, Indian commentator on energy and security
 Shriya Jha (born 1986), Indian film and television actress
 Shubhashish Jha (born 8 March 1991), Indian television actor
 Sriram Jha (born 1976), Indian chess grandmaster
 Sriti Jha (born 1986), Indian television actress
 Subhash K. Jha (born 1959), Indian film critic, journalist, editor and film trade analyst
 Sudhanshu Shekhar Jha (born 1940), Indian condensed matter physicist
 Surendra Jha 'Suman' (1910–2002), Indian Maithili-language poet
 Suvarna Jha, Indian television actress
 Tarakant Jha (1927–2014), Indian chairperson of the Bihar Legislative Council
 Udit Narayan Jha (born 1955), Bollywood playback singer
 Vikas Kumar Jha, Indian journalist and author
 Vinay Kumar Jha (born 1971), Nepalese cricket umpire

W-Z 
  Dr Y P Viyogi (born 1948), Indian Physicist from Madhubani district

Army personnel 

 Avijit Misra – Colonel in Indian Army
 B. D. Mishra – former brigadier of the Indian Army, 19th Governor of Arunachal Pradesh

Doctors 

 Anoop Misra – Endocrinologist
 B. K. Misra – Neurosurgeon
 Mohan Mishra – Physician
Dr Sanjeev Nayan Jha (eye surgeon

Entertainers 

 Akhilendra Mishra – Indian film and television character actor.
 Amit Mishra (singer) – Indian singer and songwriter
 Kranti Prakash Jha - Bollywood actor and model
 Leela Mishra – film actor
 Narendra Jha – Bollywood actor
 Piyush Mishra – Indian film actor, music director, lyricist, and writer
 Prachi Mishra – Femina Miss India Earth 2012
 Sanjay Mishra (actor) – Indian actor and comedian known from the show Office Office
 S. K. Misro – Telugu film and theatre personality
 Smriti Mishra – Indian film actress famous for her roles in parallel cinema.
 Sriti Jha – Bollywood actor
 Sudhir Mishra – Indian film director and screenwriter
 Sugandha Mishra – Indian singer and television presenter
 Vanya Mishra – Femina Miss India 2012
 Kaveri Jha (born 1983), Indian film actress
 Komal Jha (born 1987), Indian film actress
 Kranti Prakash Jha, Indian film actor

Government officers 

 Arun Kumar Chaudhary - DG Police of Bihar (1989-1993)
 Baidyanath Misra – former Vice-Chancellor of the Odisha University of Agriculture and Technology
 Brajesh Mishra (First National Security Advisor of India)
 Durga Shanker Mishra -Principal Secretary Ministry of housing and urban affairs, India.
 Krishna Chaudhary - DG Police, NDRF (MHA), RPF, ITBP (2015-17)
 Nripendra Misra – Principal Secretary to the Prime Minister of India
 Ramakant Mishra – IAS officer and renowned scholar
 Satyananda Mishra – National Security Advisor
 Vikas Mishra (economist) – former Vice-Chancellor of Kurukshetra University

Judiciary 

 Justice Arun Kumar Mishra -Supreme court of India
 Justice Dipak Misra – Former Chief Justice of India
 Justice Gyan Sudha Mishra – Judge of the Supreme Court of India
 Justice Ranganath Misra – Former Chief Justice of India, known for 'Mishra Commission'
 Kanhaiya Lal Misra – Advocate General (Uttar Pradesh)

Performing artists 

 Baiju Bawra – Singer
 Bhubaneswari Mishra – Odia classical singer
 Birju Maharaj – Kathak dancer
 Chhannulal Mishra – Hindustani classical music singer
 Lalmani Misra – Indian classical musician
 Lisa Mishra – Indian singer and composer
 Rajan and Sajan Mishra – Contemporary North Indian Musician
 Sanjay Mishra (musician) – Indian born American guitarist and composer.
 Shivnath Mishra – Indian sitarist and composer

Poets and scholars 

 Vidyapati - Maithili poet and a Sanskrit writer
Gangesha Upadhyaya - 12th-century Indian mathematician and philosopher
 Maitreyi - Ancient Philosopher
 Shvetaketu - Vedic sage
 Uddalaka Aruni - Vedic sage
 Yajnavalkya - Vedic sage and philosopher
 Ashtavakra - Vedic sage
 Aksapada Gautama - Ancient philosopher and the composer of Nyāya Sūtras
 Gargi - Ancient indian philosopher 
 Vachaspati Mishra - Philosopher
 Bhawani Prasad Mishra – Poet (1913–1985)
 Godabarish Mishra – Poet,
 Hara Prasad Misra – Scholar in oxidative free radical research
 Hemanta Mishra, Nepalese conservation biologist
 Jayamant Mishra – Jayamant Mishra, (1925–2010) Sanskrit scholar and Maithili poet,
 Keshavdas – Sanskrit scholar.
 Maṇḍana Miśra – 8th century Indian philosopher, Maṇḍana Miśra is best known as the author of the Brahmasiddhi.
 Madan Mohan Mishra, Nepalese author
 Prabhat Mishra, Professor in the Department of Computer and Information Science and Engineering and a UF Research Foundation Professor at the University of Florida
 Rambhadracharya, Jagadguru Ramanandacharya Swami Rambhadracharya, Founder Tulsi Peeth and Founder Chancellor Jagadguru Rambhadracharya Handicapped University, Chitrakoot
 Srivatsanka Mishra – also called Koorathazhwar, Philosopher in Vishishtadvaita philosophy & disciple of Ramanujacharya
 Vācaspati Miśra, 10th century scholar, Author of TattvaBindu

Politicians 

 Bedanand Jha (died 2006), Nepalese politician
 Binodanand Jha (born 1900), Indian politician, Chief Minister of Bihar
 Bidhu Jha (born 1942), Canadian politician
 Bhadrakali Mishra – Senior (Nepali) politician, Minister and Chairperson of King Bridendra's Privy Council
 Ram Naryan Mishra – Nepali politician, Minister in BP Koirala cabinet(brother of Bhadrakali Mishra)
 Hari Shankar Mishra – Nepali politician, former MP and Governor of Province No 2 (son of Ram Narayan Mishra)
 Chaturanan Mishra – Former Indian Agriculture Minister
 Dwarka Prasad Mishra – Politician, former Chief Minister of Madhya Pradesh
 Gopal Jee Thakur -Indian Politician, Member of Parliament from Darbhanga Lok Sabha Constituency
 Jagannath Mishra – Politician, former Chief Minister of Bihar
 Janeshwar Mishra (Samajwadi Party Leader)
 Kalraj Misra – Former Union Minister for MSME
 Lalit Narayan Mishra – Former Indian Rail Minister
 Navendu Mishra – British Labour MP
 Nitish Mishra – JDU Leader Bihar And state Cabinet minister of Bihar
 Prem Chandra Mishra – Member of Legislative Council, Bihar, Indian National Congress politician and former Bihar NSUI Chief.
 Rabindra Mishra, Nepalese politician and former journalist
 Satish Chandra Mishra (BSP Leader) Former Advocate General UP
 Shyam Nandan Prasad Mishra – Indian National Congress politician, eminent Parliamentarian and Central Minister.
 Sripati Misra (Former Chief Minister of Uttar Pradesh)
 Surjya Kanta Mishra – CPIM Leader, Leader of Opposition Bengal Assembly

Sportsperson 

 Abhimanyu Mishra - World's youngest chess grandmaster
 Amit Mishra – Indian cricketer
 Mohnish Mishra – Indian cricketer
 Suresh Kumar Mishra – Former Indian volleyball team captain
 Tanmay Mishra – Kenyan cricketer
 Abhimanyu Mishra - US Chess player of Indian-origin holding the record of being the youngest Chess Grandmaster in the world.

Writers 

 Rajkamal Chaudhary – Maithili poet, writer, novelist, thinker 
 Usha Kiran Khan – Maithili writer and novelist
 Surendra Jha 'Suman' – Maithili writer & poet
 Jayakant Mishra - writer
 Jayamant Mishra - Maithili poet & renowned Sanskrit scholar

Other notable persons 

 Abhimanyu Mishra - as of July 2021, youngest chess Grandmaster ever.
 Anupam Mishra – Environmentalist & water conservationist
 Neelesh Misra – Journalist
.  Aman Jha.   - Scholar
 Vishal Misra – Indian-American scientist at Columbia University
 Rahul Mishra – Indian fashion designer
 Rakesh Mishra – Indian scientist specializing in genomics and epigenetics
 Sameer Mishra – 81st Scripps National Spelling Bee champion (USA)
 Sourav Mishra – Reuters journalist, one of the first witnesses of 2008 Mumbai Attacks
 Sudhir Kumar Mishra – Aerospace engineer, CEO of BrahMos Aerospace. *Gp Capt AC Mishra, CT expert and TV panelist, Motivational speaker
 Amar Upadhyay, Indian model, film and television actor
 Amod Prasad Upadhyay (born 1936), Nepalese social worker and politician
 Ayodhya Prasad Upadhyay (1865–1947), writer of Hindi literature
 Brahmabandhav Upadhyay (1861–1907), Bengali Brahmin, nephew of the Indian freedom-fighter Kalicharan Banerjee
 Chabilal Upadhyaya (1882-1980), Nepali Brahmin(Bahun), First President (Selected) of Assam Pradesh Congress Committee
 Chintan Upadhyay (born 1972), Indian contemporary artist, arrested in connection with the double murder
 Chandrika Prasad Upadhyay, Indian politician
 Deendayal Upadhyaya - RSS thinker and co-founder of the political party Bharatiya Jana Sangh.
 Darshan Upadhyaya, professional ESports player
 Harilal Upadhyay (1916–1994), Gujarati author
 Hema Upadhyay (1972–2015), Indian artist who lived and worked in Mumbai, India since 1998
 Kedar Nath Upadhyay, Chief Justice of Nepal at Supreme Court
 Kishore Upadhyaya, Indian politician
 Krishnakant Upadhyay (born 1986), cricketer from Uttar Pradesh
 Lalit Upadhyay, Indian field hockey player, part of Indian national team
 Munishwar Dutt Upadhyay, Indian politician and statesman, leader in the Indian independence movement
 Ram Kinkar Upadhyay, noted scholar on Indian scriptures and a recipient of Padma Bhushan, the third highest civil award of India
 Samrat Upadhyay, Nepalese writer who writes in English
 Satish Upadhyay (born 1962), the President of the Delhi Unit of Bharatiya Janata Party (BJP)
 Seema Upadhyay (born 1965), Indian politician, belonging to Bahujan Samaj Party
 Shailendra Kumar Upadhyay, Nepalese diplomat and politician
 Shrikrishna Upadhyay (born 1945), Nepalese economist
 Umesh Upadhyay, veteran Indian television journalist & media executive, President News at Network18
 Vikas Upadhyay, general secretary for All India Youth Congress

References 

Maithil Brahmins